Hezekiah Flinn was a member of the Wisconsin State Assembly.

Biography
Flinn was born on March 7, 1825, in Leesville, Indiana. He died in 1892.

Career
Flinn was a member of the Assembly during the 1877, 1878 and 1879 sessions. Additionally, he was elected Mayor of Watertown, Wisconsin, in 1873 and 1874 and as an alderman (city councilman) in 1877. He was a Democrat.

References

External links
Wisconsin Historical Society

People from Lawrence County, Indiana
Politicians from Watertown, Wisconsin
Democratic Party members of the Wisconsin State Assembly
Mayors of places in Wisconsin
Wisconsin city council members
1825 births
1892 deaths
19th-century American politicians